Almost Human may refer to:

Film 
 Almost Human (1927 film), an American silent film directed by Frank Urson
 Almost Human (1974 film), an Italian crime film directed by Umberto Lenzi
 Almost Human (1977 film) or Shock Waves, an American horror film directed by Ken Wiederhorn
 Almost Human (2013 film), an American sci-fi horror film directed by Joe Begos
 Almost Human Inc., a special-effects company owned by Robert Green Hall

Literature 
 Almost Human: Making Robots Think, a 2007 book by Lee Gutkind
 "Almost Human", a short story by Ruth Rendell from her 1976 collection The Fallen Curtain
 "Almost Human", a short story by Robert Bloch, twice adapted for radio:
 "Almost Human", a 1950 episode of the radio show Dimension X
 "Almost Human", a 1955 episode of the radio show X Minus One

Music 
 Almost Human (Maya Beiser album), 2006
 Almost Human (Voltaire album), 2000
 Almost Human, a 2001 album by Cripple Bastards
 "Almost Human", a song by Deep Purple from Abandon
 "Almost Human", a song by Kiss from Love Gun
 "Almost Human", a song by Lauren Daigle from the film soundtrack Blade Runner 2049

Other media 
 Almost Human (TV series), a 2013 American science fiction series
 Almost Human, a Finnish video game company known for Legend of Grimrock